Taiping is a town in Jingchuan County, Gansu province, China. , it administers the following 15 villages:
Sanxing Village
Hongyawan Village
Hejia Village
Zhoujia Village
Zhaiziwa Village
Silangdian Village
Koujia Village
Ya'ao Village
Qiqianguan Village
Huangchang Village
Pankou Village
Jiao Village
Zhujiagou Village
Likou Village
Yinpo Village

References

Township-level divisions of Gansu
Jingchuan County